Azerbaijan competed at the 2019 World Aquatics Championships in Gwangju, South Korea from 12 to 28 July.

Swimming

Azerbaijan entered one swimmer.

Men

References

Nations at the 2019 World Aquatics Championships
Azerbaijan at the World Aquatics Championships
World Aquatics